Xenoturbella is a genus of very simple bilaterians up to a few centimeters long. It contains a small number of marine benthic worm-like species.

The first known species (Xenoturbella bocki) was discovered in 1915 by Sixten Bock, but it was only properly described in 1949 by Einar Westblad.

Description

Xenoturbella has a very simple body plan. It consists of dorsoventrally flattened acoelomate animals, with an anterior circumferential furrow. It shows two ciliated epithelial layers: an external epidermis and an internal gastrodermis lining the simple sac-like gut. The multiciliated epiderm displays unique interconnected ciliary rootlets and mode of withdrawal and resorption of worn epidermal cells. The mouth is a mid-ventral pore leading to a gastral cavity, and there is no anus: waste is dispelled through the same opening as food is taken in.

The nervous system is composed by a net of interconnected neurons beneath the epidermis, without any concentration of neurons forming ganglia or nerve cords.

Species of Xenoturbella also lack a respiratory, circulatory and excretory system. In fact, there are no defined organs, except for an anterior statocyst containing flagellated cells and a frontal pore organ. There are no organized gonads, but gametes are produced. Adults producing sperm are very rarely observed, but eggs and embryos are known to occur in follicles.

Newly hatched embryos are free-swimming (tending to stay close to water surface) and ciliated. They feature no mouth and they do not apparently feed. They are similar to the juveniles of acoelomate Neochildia fusca.

Systematics

Etymology 
The term Xenoturbella derives from the Ancient Greek word , meaning "strange, unusual", and from the Latin word turbella meaning "stir, bustle". This refers to the enigmatic, unusual taxonomic status of the animal, initially considered as related to turbellarians, a group of flatworms whose aquatic species stir microscopic particles close to their ciliated epidermis.

Taxonomy 
Currently the genus Xenoturbella contains 6 recognized species:
 Xenoturbella bocki Westblad, 1949 [Xenoturbella westbladi Israelsson, 1999]
 Xenoturbella churro Rouse, Wilson, Carvajal & Vrijenhoek, 2016
 Xenoturbella hollandorum Rouse, Wilson, Carvajal & Vrijenhoek, 2016
 Xenoturbella japonica Nakano, 2017
 Xenoturbella monstrosa Rouse, Wilson, Carvajal & Vrijenhoek, 2016
 Xenoturbella profunda Rouse, Wilson, Carvajal & Vrijenhoek, 2016

Phylogeny

Among species 

Among animals 
The systematic and phylogenetic position of Xenoturbella among animals has been considered enigmatic since its discovery. An early DNA analysis suggested a close relationship to molluscs, but it was probably a result from contamination with DNA of molluscs that Xenoturbella consumes.

A subsequent study suggested a placement of the genus in its own phylum, Xenoturbellida, as a deuterostome clade and sister group to the Ambulacraria. The deuterostome affiliations were then recovered by studies that indicate a basal position of this phylum within the deuterostomes or in a sister group relationship with the Ambulacraria.

However, morphological characters, such as the structure of epidermal cilia, suggested a close relationship with Acoelomorpha, another problematic group. The study of the embryonic stages of Xenoturbella also showed that it is a direct developer without a feeding larval stage, and this developmental mode is similar to that of acoelomorphs. Molecular studies based on the concatenation of hundreds of proteins revealed indeed a monophyletic group composed by Xenoturbella and Acoelomorpha. This clade was named Xenacoelomorpha.

The monophyly of Xenacoelomorpha soon became established, but its position as either a basal bilaterian clade or a deuterostome remained unresolved until 2016 when two new studies, with increased gene and taxon sampling, again placed Xenoturbella as the sister group of Acoelomorpha within Xenacoelomorpha, and placed Xenacoelomorpha as sister to Nephrozoa (Protostomia plus Deuterostomia), and therefore the basalmost bilaterian phylum.

References

Further reading
 G. Haszprunar, R.M. Rieger, P. Schuchert (1991). "Extant 'Problematica' within or near the Metazoa." In: Simonetta, A.M. & Conway Morris, S. (eds.): The Early Evolution of Metazoa and the Significance of Problematic Taxa. Oxford Univ. Press, Cambridge. pp. 99–105

External links

A PCR Survey of Xenoturbella bocki Hox Genes
Movie of adult Xenoturbella bocki

Bilaterian genera
Xenacoelomorpha